Blanket clemency is clemency granted to multiple persons and can be in the form of a pardon, shortening of a prison sentence, or a commutation of a sentence, or a reprieve. Most states' governors and the President of the United States have the power to grant clemency; In other states, that power is committed to an appointed agency or board, or to a board and the governor in some hybrid arrangement. Retiring Governor George Ryan of Illinois issued a blanket clemency to all death row inmates after special clemency hearings in January 2003.

References
 -PJStar.com
Katy Chevigny and Kirsten Johnson, Deadline,  Big Mouth Productions, 2004.

American legal terminology